The MV Karadeniz Powership Zeynep Sultan is a Liberia-flagged Powership, a floating power plant, owned and operated by Karpowership. Built in 1984 by the Valmet Oy Helsingin Telakka in Vuosaari, Helsinki, Finland and christened MV Pavel Antokolsky, she sailed as a barge carrier under various names and flags until in 2015 she was converted into a Powership at the Sedef Shipyard in Tuzla, Istanbul, Turkey. She is commissioned to supply electricity to the power grid in Amurang, North Sulawesi, Indonesia.

Barge carrier

She was built by the Valmet Oy Vuosaari shipyard in Helsinki, Finland with yard number 315 as a barge carrier (LASH carrier) in September 1984.

She saw service under the names Pavel Antokolsky, Smit Explorer and Explorer before she was sold in 2011 to Karpowership.

Powership
The originally barge carrier was converted into a Powership at the Sedef Shipyard in Tuzla, Istanbul. She was renamed Karadeniz Powership Zeynep Sultan (KPS11). The construction cost was partly financed by a credit in amount of US$75 million shared by the German Investment Corp. (DEG), Netherlands Development Finance Co. (FMO) and Cordiant Capital Inc./ICF International. She has a generation capacity of 125 MW on dual-fuel (HFO- and gas-fired). The vessel is registered under the Liberian flag with homeport Monrovia.

On 27 October 2015, the Powership set sail to Jakarta, Indonesia departing from Istanbul following a farewell ceremony, at which another Powership of the fleet, the KPS7 – Karadeniz Powership Ayşegül Sultan, weighed anchor to head to Ghana. Karadeniz Powership Zeynep Sultan arrived to Jakarta by the end of November 2015, and sailed to Amurang, where she is helping to resolve the perennial power cuts in North Sulawesi.

Ship's registry
 ex-MV Pavel Antokolsky owned by Ukrainian Danube Shipping Co. based in Izmail, Ukraine registered in the Ukrainian SSR with homeport Izmail until January 1992 and in Ukraine with homeport Izmail until 14 June 1992,
 ex-MV Smit Explorer owned by Smit Transport & Heavy Lift  B.V. based in Rotterdam, Netherlands registered in Malta with homeport Valletta until 2000, and owned by Navigo Management Co. Ltd. based in Singapore registered in Singapore with homeport Singapore until 23 January 2001, and owned by Navigo Management Co. Ltd. based in Limassol, Cyprus registered in the Bahamas with homeport Nassau until 16 December 2003,
 ex-MV Explorer owned by Dockwise Shipping based in Breda, Netherlands registered in the Netherlands Antilles with homeport Willemstad until 10 October 2010 and registered in Curaçao with homeport Willemstad until April 2011.

References

External links

1984 ships
Ships built in Helsinki
Merchant ships
Ships of Ukraine
Merchant ships of the Netherlands
Ships of Liberia
Zeynep Sultan
Electric power infrastructure in Indonesia
Ships built at Sedef Shipyard